Madiha Yousri (née Hannouma Habib Khalil Ali; 3 December 1921 – 29 May 2018) was an Egyptian film and television actress.  She starred in dozens of classic Egyptian films over the course of her career, spanning a time of over 50 years. Her work spanned genres from drama to comedy to tragedy. Yousri was also very known for her support to Egypt's president Abdel Fattah el-Sisi and the 26 of July revolution. She was also appointed by late President Hosni Mubarak as a member of the Shura council in 1998.

Early life 
Madiha Yousri was born on December 3, 1921 in Cairo, Egypt as 'Honouma Habib Khalil Ali', to a lower middle-class Egyptian family within a humble neighborhood.

Career
She was discovered by the Egyptian director Mohammed Karim while sitting with friends at a cafe. When she would later describe the meeting, she remembered listening to Karim while thinking that her father would never allow his daughter to act. Her debut role was in a film directed by Karin in 1940, Mamnau'a Al-Hub (en: Forbidden Love). She went on to appear in many films, alongside many of Egypt's famous musicians of the time, including Abdel-Halim Hafez, Mohamed Fawzi and Farid Al-Atrash.

In the 1940s, Time magazine chose Yousri as one of the world's 10 most beautiful women. In 1963, Yousri was awarded Egypt's State Medal of Creativity.

In 1969, she was a member of the jury at the 6th Moscow International Film Festival. She was known for her classical romance roles in the Egyptian cinema, as well as participating in many Egyptian tv series playing mainly the mother or grandmother roles.

Near the end of her life, Yousri was given an honorary doctorate from the Egyptian Arts Academy.

Death
On 29 May 2018, Madiha died  in a local hospital after suffering from chronic illness at the age of 96.

Selected filmography 
1944 – Rossassa Fi Al-Qalb (en: A Bullet in the Heart)
1947 – Azhar wa Ashwak (أزهار وأشواك)
1952 – Lahn al-Kholood (لحن الخلود, en: Immortal Song)
1954 – Hayaa aw Mout (en: Life or Death)
1956 – Ard Al-Ahlam (en: Land of Dreams), nominated for the Palme d'Or at Cannes Film Festival
1962 – Al-Khataya (en: The Sins)
1994 – Al-Irhabi (en: The Terrorist), Madiha's final cinema appearance

References

External links

Madiha Yusri at IMDb
Madiha Yousri Died at 97
Article about Madiha Yousri

1921 births
2018 deaths
Egyptian film actresses
Actresses from Cairo
Egyptian television actresses